Vernon H. Vaughan (February 11, 1838 – December 4, 1878) was an American political leader.

Biography
Born in Mount Meigs, Alabama, he served as Utah territorial secretary to Governor John Shaffer, and after Shaffer's untimely death in office, President Ulysses S. Grant appointed Vaughan to fill the vacancy as acting governor. He served three uneventful months and was not reappointed. He died on December 4, 1878, in Sacramento, California.

Vaughan was a professor at the University of Alabama during the Reconstruction era.

Event of Consequence
The only event of consequence during Vernon's administration was the Wooden Gun Rebellion, which, according to John Shaffer's proclamation, was an illegal drill by members of the Nauvoo Legion in November 1870. Nevertheless, the accused were all arrested and tried, yet later all released.

Notes

1838 births
1878 deaths
People from Montgomery County, Alabama
Governors of Utah Territory
19th-century American politicians